George Innocent (13 May 1885 – 4 April 1957) was a British swimmer. He competed at the 1908 Summer Olympics and the 1912 Summer Olympics. Innocent also worked for the City of London Police and as a guard for the Bank of England.

References

1885 births
1957 deaths
British male swimmers
Olympic swimmers of Great Britain
Swimmers at the 1908 Summer Olympics
Swimmers at the 1912 Summer Olympics
Sportspeople from London
City of London Police officers